Shafi Parambil (born 12 February 1983) is an Indian politician and a member of the 14th Kerala Legislative Assembly. He is a member of the Indian National Congress and represents Palakkad constituency.

Political career
Parambil started his political life as a member of the Kerala Students Union. While in college, he was the unit office bearer of KSU and the general secretary of the college union. Parambil became the State General Secretary in 2007 and State President in 2009.

He was elected thrice to the Kerala Legislative Assembly in 2011, 2016 and 2021. In 2017, Parambil became the general secretary of Indian Youth Congress, he resigned a year later. He is currently the state president of the Indian Youth Congress. In the 2021 Kerala Legislative Assembly election he defeated E. Sreedharan by a margin of 3480 votes in a contest which drew significant attention.

Personal life
Shafi was born at Valanchery on 12 February 1983 to Shanavas Parambil and Maimoona Shanavas. He is an MBA graduate. He is married to Asheela and the couple have a daughter.

References

External links

1983 births
Indian National Congress (Organisation) politicians
Living people
Kerala MLAs 2016–2021
Kerala MLAs 2011–2016
Indian National Congress politicians from Kerala